Église Saint-Arbogast d'Offenheim  is a church in Stutzheim-Offenheim, Bas-Rhin, Alsace, France. Dated to the 12th century, it became a registered Monument historique in 1898.

References

Churches in Bas-Rhin
Monuments historiques of Bas-Rhin